The Moon-Spinners is a 1964 American mystery film starring Hayley Mills, Eli Wallach and Peter McEnery in a story about a jewel thief hiding on the island of Crete. Produced by Walt Disney Productions, the film was based upon a 1962 suspense novel by Mary Stewart and was directed by James Neilson. It featured the legendary silent film actress Pola Negri in her final screen performance.

The Moon-Spinners was Hayley Mills' fifth film in the series of six for Disney. It includes her first "proper" on screen romance in a Disney movie.

Plot
A young English woman named Nikky Ferris and her aunt, Frances, a folk musicologist, travel to the village of Elounda, on the island of Crete. They rent a room at the Moon-Spinners Inn, though the innkeeper, Sophia, initially refuses them until her teenage son Alexis and Aunt Frances persuade her. Sophia's older brother, Stratos, not wanting any guests at the inn, questions Aunt Frances about why she chose the Moon-Spinners Inn, then reluctantly allows her and Nikky to stay one night.

During a wedding party at the inn later that evening, Nikky meets a young Englishman named Mark Camford, who invites her and Aunt Frances to dinner. He hints that Stratos is more than he appears. Mark then invites Nikky for a morning swim in the Bay of Dolphins. Later that night, Mark follows Stratos when he goes night fishing at the Bay of Dolphins. While watching Stratos, Mark is attacked.

The following morning, Nikky is disappointed to hear that Mark has abruptly checked out. While out walking, Nikky follows a trail of blood to a church basement where she finds a wounded Mark hiding. He asks Nikky to fetch some supplies, refusing to explain how he was shot. Nikky returns with a first aid kit, brandy, and a travel rug. Mark urges Nikky and her aunt to go to the nearby town of Agios Nikolaos for safety.

Returning to the inn, Nikky runs into Stratos, who is looking for her after learning about the missing items from Aunt Frances. Stratos sees through Nikky's cover story and searches the church, which is empty. Stratos ties Nikky up in a windmill while enlisting his crony Lambis to find Mark. Mark and Alexis later rescue Nikky.

Nikky and Mark take refuge in the ruins of an ancient temple. Mark reveals he is a former bank employee. While transporting jewelry from the bank to the Countess of Fleet, he was attacked and robbed, then fired. Mark believes Stratos stole the jewels and hid them somewhere in the Bay of Dolphins.

The duo spend the night hiding in the temple while Stratos hunts for them. The next morning, the British consul at Heraklion, Anthony Gamble, finds the pair and takes them to his summer villa in Agios Nikolaos, where his wife, Cynthia, looks after them. Anthony, who is actually Stratos' partner in crime, assures Stratos that he will deal with the couple.

Nikky learns from the Gambles that a rich woman named Madam Habib is arriving on her yacht. Mark surmises that Stratos intends to sell her the stolen jewels. Cynthia drugs Mark so that the Gambles can send him, along with Nikky, to an Athens hospital. En route to the airport, Mark awakens, tells Nikky he has to stop Stratos, kisses her, and leaves. He fights Stratos but fails to prevent him from absconding with the jewels. Nikky steals a motor launch and heads to Madame Habib's yacht.

Nikky tells Madam Habib that Stratos is a thief and is selling stolen jewels belonging to the Countess of Fleet, who happens to be an old friend of Habib's. Stratos arrives for the transaction. Mark, Frances, and Alexis arrive with the police and a fight ensues. Stratos is arrested and Madam Habib returns the jewels to Mark. Alexis leaves by boat, waving at Mark and Nikky, implying that they will be married by the time they return to Crete.

Cast

 Hayley Mills as Nikky Ferris
 Eli Wallach as Stratos
 Peter McEnery as Mark Camford
 Joan Greenwood as Frances Ferris
 Irene Papas as Sophia
 Pola Negri as Madame Habib
 Michael Davis as Alexis
 John Le Mesurier as Anthony Gamble
 Paul Stassino as Lambis
 Sheila Hancock as Cynthia Gamble
 André Morell as Yacht Captain
 George Pastell as Police Lieutenant
 Tutte Lemkow as Orestes
 Steve Plytas as Hearse Driver
 Harry Tardios as Bus Driver
 Pamela Barrie as Ariadne
 Mel Blanc as Cat Effects (uncredited)

Production
The lead character in the film is somewhat younger than in the novel. Traveling alone in the book, she is accompanied by her aunt in the film. The film is somewhat dark, similar to other Disney live-action features made in the 1950s and 1960s for more mainstream audiences, such as Treasure Island (1950) and 20,000 Leagues Under the Sea (1954). It was Walt Disney's penultimate live-action film in which he was credited as producer while alive.

Disney persuaded silent film actress Pola Negri, who had been retired for two decades, to return to the screen for this, her final film. For the 2006 biographical documentary film Pola Negri: Life Is a Dream in Cinema, both Mills and Wallach were extensively interviewed about their work with Negri in The Moon-Spinners.

Critical reception
The New York Times critic Bosley Crowther offered a mixed review, praising "the ripening attractiveness of the young British actress Hayley Mills and some beautiful scenery in color on the island of Crete", but calling the film "essentially an entertainment for the younger set". With regard to adult viewers, he noted that "it is a picture in which standard melodrama abounds – the kind that the older observer may find just too bubbling with clichés". Rotten Tomatoes, describing the film as a "distilled Hitchcockian suspense yarn, diluted for the consumption of children", gives it an approval rating of 63%.

See also
List of American films of 1964

References

External links
 
 
 

1964 films
1960s mystery films
American mystery films
Walt Disney Pictures films
Films directed by James Neilson
Films produced by Walt Disney
Films based on British novels
Films set in Crete
Films shot in Crete
Films about vacationing
American neo-noir films
Films shot at Pinewood Studios
Films produced by Bill Anderson (producer)
Films scored by Ron Grainer
1960s English-language films
1960s American films